Warren Rino (born 3 September 1993) is a French Guianan footballer who currently plays for AJ Saint-Georges in the French Guiana Honor Division and the French Guiana national team.

International career 
Rino made his national team debut for French Guiana on 8 June 2018 in a 2–0 win against Guadeloupe.

Rino scored his first goal and first competitive goal on 7 September 2018, scoring the opening goal in a 5–0 win against Anguilla, as part of 2019–20 CONCACAF Nations League qualifying.

International goals 
Scores and results list French Guiana's goal tally first.

References

External links 
 

1994 births
Living people
Sportspeople from Cayenne
Association football forwards
French Guianan footballers
French Guiana international footballers